Wang Zhendong (born January 11, 1991, in Xinyi, Jiangsu) is a Chinese racewalking athlete, He took the first place of 50 km walk title with a personal best of 3:41:02 at the Chinese National Race Walking Grand Prix in Huangshan March 6, 2016. Wang was eligible for Rio 2016 Olympic 50 km race walking entries.

Career
Born in Xiaowangzhuang, Shiji town, Xinyi, Jiangsu,  Wang was a walking enthusiast in his childhood. He represented his school and won the Xinyi race walking title in April 2005.　After that he went to Xinxi Sports school,  then Wang started his professional walking race training in Xuzhou Sports school in 2007 and became a member of Jiangsu Athletics Team in the same year. He received his first international call-up to the National Athletics Team in 2011.

International competitions

References

Living people
1991 births
Sportspeople from Xuzhou
Athletes from Jiangsu
Chinese male racewalkers
Olympic athletes of China
Athletes (track and field) at the 2016 Summer Olympics
Asian Games bronze medalists for China
Asian Games medalists in athletics (track and field)
Athletes (track and field) at the 2014 Asian Games
Medalists at the 2014 Asian Games
21st-century Chinese people